Touchstone is an album by Chick Corea, released in 1982 through Warner Bros. Records. The album peaked at number nine on Billboard Jazz Albums chart.

Track listing 
All tracks composed by Chick Corea.

 "Touchstone: Procession, Ceremony, Departure" – 10:58
 "The Yellow Nimbus" – 8:51
 "Duende" – 3:11
 "Compadres" – 9:41
 "Estancia" – 6:18
 "Dance of Chance" – 7:14

Personnel 
Musicians
 Chick Corea – acoustic piano (1, 2, 3), Fender Rhodes electric piano (4, 5, 6), Fairlight CMI, Minimoog, Moog 55 modular, Oberheim OB-Xa & Yamaha GS-1 synthesizers (1, 2, 4, 5, 6); gong, cymbal (1)
 Gayle Moran – vocals, speech/speaker/speaking part, voices (1)
 Allen Vizzutti – trumpet (6)
 Steve Kujala – flute, tenor saxophone (6)
 Lee Konitz  – alto saxophone (3)
 Carol Shive – violin (3)
 Gregg Gottlieb – cello (3)
 Bob Magnusson – double bass (3)
 Paco de Lucía – guitar (1, 2); hand clapping, percussion (2)
 Al Di Meola – guitar (4)
 Carles Benavent – fretless electric bass (1, 6)
 Stanley Clarke – electric bass (4)
 Lenny White – drums (4)
 Alex Acuña – drums (5, 6); snare drum, cymbals, cajón (1)
 Laudir DeOliveira – caixa, ganzá (1); caxixi, wood blocks (5)
 Don Alias – lya drum (2); bongos (5); congas (5, 6)

Production
 Chick Corea – producer
 Ron Moss – executive producer
 Joel Strote – executive producer
 Duncan Aldrich – engineer
 Bernie Grundman – engineer
 Bernie Kirsh – engineer
 Tony Cohan – liner notes

Chart performance

References

External links 
 Chick Corea - Touchstone (1982) album review by Scott Yanow, credits & releases at AllMusic
 Chick Corea - Touchstone (1982) album releases & credits at Discogs
 Chick Corea - Touchstone (1982) album to be listened as stream on Spotify

1982 albums
Chick Corea albums
Stretch Records albums